The 2002 Generali Ladies Linz is the 2002 Tier II WTA Tour tournament of the annually-held Generali Ladies Linz women's tennis tournament. It was the 16th edition of the tournament and was held from 21 October until 27 October 2002 at the Design Center Linz. Fourth-seeded Justine Henin won the singles title.

Points and prize money

Point distribution

Prize money

* per team

Singles main draw entrants

Seeds 

Rankings are as of 14 October 2002.

Other entrants 
The following players received wildcards into the singles main draw:
  Daniela Kix
  Barbara Schett
  Patricia Wartusch

The following players received entry from the qualifying draw:
  Anca Barna
  Denisa Chládková
  Lina Krasnoroutskaya
  Marie-Gaïané Mikaelian

The following players received entry as lucky losers:
  Jill Craybas
  Petra Mandula

Withdrawals 

  Lindsay Davenport → replaced by  Jill Craybas
  Martina Hingis → replaced by  Conchita Martínez
  Patty Schnyder → replaced by  Petra Mandula
  Serena Williams → replaced by  Francesca Schiavone

Retirements

  Daniela Kix (Stomach cramps)

Doubles main draw entrants

Seeds 

Rankings are as of 14 October 2002.

Other entrants
The following pair received wildcards into the doubles main draw:
  Daniela Klemenschits /  Sandra Klemenschits

The following pair received entry from the qualifying draw:
  Greta Arn /  Marie-Gaïané Mikaelian

The following pair received entry as lucky losers:
  Jill Craybas /  Maja Murić

Finals

Singles

  Justine Henin defeated  Alexandra Stevenson, 6–3, 6–0.
It was Henin's 6th WTA singles title, and second title of the year.

Doubles

  Jelena Dokic /  Nadia Petrova defeated  Rika Fujiwara /  Ai Sugiyama, 6–3, 6–2.
It was Dokic's 4th WTA doubles title, and first of the year. It was Petrova's 3rd WTA doubles title, and first of the year. The pair were the defending champions, and this was the second and final doubles title they won together as a pair. This would also be Dokic's final WTA doubles title.

References

Generali Ladies Linz
Linz Open
Generali Ladies Linz
Generali Ladies Linz
Generali